The 1994 CCHA Men's Ice Hockey Tournament was the 23rd CCHA Men's Ice Hockey Tournament. It was played between March 11 and March 20, 1994. First round games were played at campus sites, while second round and 'final four' games were played at Joe Louis Arena in Detroit, Michigan. By winning the tournament, Michigan received the Central Collegiate Hockey Association's automatic bid to the 1994 NCAA Division I Men's Ice Hockey Tournament.

Format
The tournament featured four rounds of play. The teams that finished in the top six in conference standings were allowed to choose their opponents in descending order for the first round. Alaska–Fairbanks was an affiliate member and allowed to compete in the conference tournament as the lowest seed. The first seed chose to play the eleventh seed, the second seed chose to play the tenth seed, third seed chose to play the ninth seed, the fourth seed chose to play the eighth seed, the fifth seed chose to play the twelfth seed and the sixth seed played the seventh seed in best-of-three series, with the winners advancing to the second round. The highest two remaining seeds received byes into the semifinal round while the remaining four teams competing in single-game second round series. The highest and lowest non-advancing teams were matched against one another for one game while the remaining two teams competing in the other game. In the semifinals the higher automatic qualifier played the lower seed advancing from the second round while and second highest and second lowest seeds play each using single game to determine which teams advance to the finals. The tournament champion receives an automatic bid to the 1994 NCAA Division I Men's Ice Hockey Tournament.

Conference standings
Note: GP = Games played; W = Wins; L = Losses; T = Ties; PTS = Points; GF = Goals For; GA = Goals Against

Bracket

Note: * denotes overtime period(s)

First round

(1) Michigan vs. (11) Kent State

(2) Lake Superior State vs. (10) Ohio State

(3) Michigan State vs. (9) Illinois–Chicago

(4) Western Michigan vs. (8) Notre Dame

(5) Miami vs. (12) Alaska–Fairbanks

(6) Bowling Green vs. (7) Ferris State

Second round

(3) Michigan State vs. (6) Bowling Green

(4) Western Michigan vs. (5) Miami

Semifinals

(1) Michigan vs. (4) Western Michigan

(2) Lake Superior State vs. (3) Michigan State

Championship

(1) Michigan vs. (2) Lake Superior State

Tournament awards

All-Tournament Team
F Mike Stone* (Michigan)
F Brian Wiseman (Michigan)
F Steve Guolla (Michigan State)
D Blake Sloan (Michigan)
D Steven Halko (Michigan)
G Blaine Lacher (Lake Superior State)
* Most Valuable Player(s)

References

External links
CCHA Champions
1993–94 CCHA Standings
1993–94 NCAA Standings

CCHA Men's Ice Hockey Tournament
Ccha tournament